The North Atlantic Council (NAC) is the principal political decision-making body of the North Atlantic Treaty Organization (NATO), consisting of permanent representatives of its member countries. It was established by Article 9 of the North Atlantic Treaty, and it is the only body in NATO that derives its authority explicitly from the treaty.

Powers and duties
The North Atlantic Treaty gave the NAC the power to set up subsidiary bodies for various policy functions, including a defense committee to implement other parts of the treaty.  Since 1952, the NAC has been in permanent session. The NAC can be held at the Permanent Representative Level (PermReps), or can be composed of member states' Ministers of State, Defense, or Heads of Government. The NAC has the same powers regardless of the formation under which it meets. The NAC meets twice a week: every Tuesday, for an informal lunch discussion; and every Wednesday for a decision-taking session. Usually, meetings occur amongst the Permanent Representatives who are the senior permanent member of each delegation and is generally a senior civil servant or an experienced ambassador (and holding that diplomatic rank).  The list of Permanent Representatives may be found on the NATO website.

The 30 members of NATO have diplomatic missions to the organization through embassies in Belgium. The meetings of the NAC are chaired by the Secretary General and, when decisions have to be made, action is agreed upon on the basis of unanimity and common accord. There is no voting or decision by majority. Each nation represented at the NAC table or on any of its subordinate committees retains complete sovereignty and responsibility for its own decisions.

Composition
Each member nation is normally represented on the North Atlantic Council by an Ambassador or Permanent Representative supported by a national delegation composed of advisers and officials who represent their country on different NATO committees.

See also
Secretary General of NATO
NATO Military Committee
International Military Staff

Notes

References

Bibliography

External links
 North Atlantic Council at the NATO website